Superman of Earth-Two is an alternate version of the fictional superhero Superman, who appears in American comic books published by DC Comics. The character was introduced after DC Comics created Earth-Two, a parallel world that was retroactively established as the home of characters whose adventures had been published in the Golden Age of comic books. This allowed creators to publish Superman comic books taking place in current continuity while being able to disregard Golden Age stories, solving an incongruity, as Superman had been published as a single ongoing incarnation since inception. This version of the character first appeared in Justice League of America #73 (August 1969).

Fictional character biography
When the Golden Age of Comic Books came to a close in the 1950s, most of DC Comics' superhero comic books ceased publication. At the start of the Silver Age, characters such as the Flash and Green Lantern were revamped for more modern times, ignoring or abandoning established continuity and thus making a clean break between the two eras. It was later established that the Golden Age and Silver Age heroes lived on Earth-Two and Earth-One respectively, these being separate parallel Earths in a single Multiverse.

Superman was one of the few exceptions; his stories had been published without interruption since his 1938 debut in Action Comics #1. This caused a continuity problem, in that Superman was simultaneously a member of the Justice Society of America on Earth-Two and also member of the Justice League of America on Earth-One. Writer Dennis O'Neil eventually resolved that there were two Supermen. The Silver Age Superman was Kal-El from Earth-One, and the Golden Age Superman was Kal-L from Earth-Two.

Several differences between the two Supermen were established to clarify the distinction. The Earth-One names "Kal-El," "Jor-El," and "Jonathan and Martha Kent" became "Kal-L," "Jor-L," and "John and Mary Kent" on Earth-Two, as in the original Golden Age stories. Kal-L's costume was largely adapted from the 1940s drawing style, retaining the famous sweatshirt wrist-cuffs, while his S-shield symbol was originally very different from the main Superman S-symbol, adapting the 1940s six-sided version with the tail endings and hard-left tilt of the S-edges. George Pérez famously redesigned Kal-L's 1940s S-shield (starting in Justice League America #197) to be mostly the main S-symbol with five sides, and to merely reflect the tilt connecting the upper edge to the side of shield. Some artists such as Alex Ross and others, including Justice Society series artist Dale Eaglesham, continued to use the specific six-sided 1940s S-shield after Perez's change for Kal-L. Stories featuring both Supermen also indicated that Kal-L was the older of the two, being depicted as late-middle-aged, with grey or solid-white hair at the base hairline and face wrinkles, while his Earth-One counterpart was a youthful man of modern times.

These choices not only helped DC Comics to restore continuity to some of the character's Golden Age stories, but also led them to experiment with a Superman other than the mainstream one. Several differences between Kal-L and the better-known Kal-El were introduced. Kal-L was written to be different from the original Golden Age Superman, most famously by revealing his dual identities of Clark Kent and Superman to the woman he loved in the late 1940s, the Earth-Two version of Lois Lane, and eventually marrying her in 1950. Their early marital life was depicted in the feature "Mr. & Mrs. Superman" in DC's Superman Family series, which was very different from the original published Superman stories of the 1940s and 1950s, in which Kent kept his secret from Lane and never married her.

Allies
As Superman, Kal-L was considered the first public superhero in the history of Earth-Two, being the first individual to appear regularly in a colorful costume and display superhuman abilities, in contrast to earlier part-time super-powered heroes such as Dr. Occult.

In a contended story, Kal-L received some brief training in his teen years from his Earth-One counterpart, after Superboy was accidentally hurled into Earth-Two (and back in time several decades to the early 1930s). In this story Kal-L briefly attains flight by hovering, an account that is refuted in all other stories specific to Kal-L, as he is stated only to be able to superleap until adulthood. This suggests that the story relates to another Kal-L counterpart in the pre-Crisis infinite multiverse, rather than to the actual Earth-Two Superman. However, in Superman Family #207 (May/June 1981), Kal-L tells Lois about having met Superboy, suggesting the above story did occur as written.

Kal-L began fighting evil on a local level in his base of operations, the American city of Metropolis. Later in his career he would consider first the entire United States and then the whole world under his protection. In November 1940 Superman became a founding member of the Justice Society of America. Like Batman, he was referred to as an "honorary member" during the original meeting of the Justice Society. He subsequently appeared with it in two published adventures during the 1940s, aiding them on several other occasions retroactively as a member of the World War II All-Star Squadron. He built a secret citadel in the mountains outside Metropolis as his headquarters, as shown in Infinite Crisis, and eventually built a Fortress of Solitude comparable to that of his Earth-One counterpart.

In later years, Kal-L was considered an elder statesman of Earth-Two's superhero community, the one that later generations of superheroes looked to as an example and role model. In his secret identity as Clark Kent, Superman also enjoyed success at the Daily Star, of which he was appointed editor-in-chief in the 1950s, replacing George Taylor.

Fellow Kryptonians
In 1950 Superman encountered three other surviving Kryptonians, U-Ban, Kizo and Mala. All three brothers were members of the ruling scientific council exiled from Krypton after they attempted to conquer the planet. Imprisoned in suspended animation in tube vessels, they were later freed. Superman's lookalike Mala later created a counterfeit Earth. These Golden Age stories and characters were never referred to in later Earth-Two stories.

At some time during the Silver Age, Superman's cousin Kara arrived on Earth after a lengthy journey from Krypton. When her father Zor-L discovered that Krypton was about to explode, he placed her in a spacecraft directed towards Earth. Although this occurs at the same time as Kal-L's ship is launched, Kara's ship travels more slowly, and she arrives on Earth decades after her cousin has landed. Kara's Symbioship is designed to keep her in stasis during the journey and provide her with life experiences and education in the form of a virtual reality. By the time she arrives on Earth, Kara is in her later teens to early twenties.

The Symbioship provided virtual copies of Zor-L, Alura and fellow Kryptonians from within her home city of Kandor. Once removed from the ship, this virtual reality ceased to exist. Only Kara – Power Girl, as she would later be known – was known to interact with this virtual Kryptonian reality.

Crisis on Infinite Earths

Kal-L was one of the heroes from various Earths who fought to save the Multiverse from destruction during the events of Crisis on Infinite Earths and was present at the battle at the Dawn of Time, in which the five remaining Earths were merged into a single universe. As a result, Kal-L still existed and still remembered the history of his home reality, even though no one in the new reality remembered he had ever existed.

After grieving over the loss of his wife Lois and his friends from Earth-Two, Kal-L joins the remaining heroes for a final battle with the Anti-Monitor in the Anti-Matter Universe, where the Anti-Monitor has absorbed all life. After the small army of heroes manage to weaken the Anti-Monitor, Kal-L chooses to stay behind and sacrifice himself to save the new universe while the other heroes leave, not wanting to live on in a world that no longer remembers him. After a prolonged battle, Kal-L strikes the final blow that kills the Anti-Monitor.

Alexander Luthor, Jr. of Earth-Three then reveals to Kal-L that he saved the Lois Lane Kent of Earth-Two from the collapse of the Multiverse. He then transports Kal-L, Lois Lane, Superboy of Earth-Prime and himself into a paradise dimension, sealing themselves off from the universe.

As a tribute to the Earth-Two Superman, before the Superman character was recreated by John Byrne in the Man of Steel mini-series, Kal-L's origin was retold in Secret Origins #1 (April 1986), written by Roy Thomas and drawn by former Superman artist Wayne Boring.

In post-Crisis continuity, Kal-L's role in various All-Star Squadron adventures was taken by the character Iron Munro from the Young All-Stars series. Kal-L's roles as the most respected member of the Justice Society of America and the person who found his cousin Power Girl were given to the Golden Age Green Lantern Alan Scott and to Kal-El respectively. Lee Travis (the first Crimson Avenger) became the first costumed hero of the post-Crisis universe after being shown a vision of Kal-El's future heroism before the start of his career (keeping Superman as the inspiration for Earth's superheroes in the new universe as well).

Kal-L later felt that the paradise was more a prison than a refuge, and eventually discovered a doorway that would allow him to leave the paradise dimension without causing the destruction of the universe.

Infinite Crisis

Kal was content to stay in the paradise dimension until Lois began to fall ill, when he created a replica of Metropolis and the Daily Star office building in an attempt to help. After the attempt failed, Kal-L began to believe Alexander's claims that the paradise dimension was eating away at their souls. Alexander and Superboy used Kal-L's distraction over Lois' health to break out of the paradise dimension and start their plan to recreate the Multiverse.

Appalled by the rapidly deteriorating state of affairs in the world, Kal-L and his three companions emerge from their self-imposed exile to help. Kal-L batters an exit through the crystalline barrier which has separated them from the rest of reality. He then meets up with Power Girl, explains her true origins and the events of the previous Crisis, and enlists her help.

The touch of the Earth-Two Lois restores Power Girl's memories, and Kal-L then reveals to her that his plan is to bring back Earth-Two. He then tries to enlist Batman's aid by claiming that Batman's distrust of the heroes has been caused by Earth-One's darker nature, and promises always to stand by him when the "right" Earth returns. Batman, however, asks Kal-L if the Dick Grayson of this Earth is a corrupted version of the one that Kal-L knew, and attempts to use the Kryptonite ring against him. Kal-L destroys the ring and departs.

Power Girl is knocked out and captured by Superboy-Prime after discovering Alexander Luthor Jr.'s tuning fork, which he plans to use to restore the Multiverse in order to search for the perfect Earth. Alexander succeeds in recreating Earth-Two, causing Kal-L, the Earth-Two Lois and the heroes who originated on Earth-Two to be sent there.

Soon after their arrival on Earth-Two, the Earth-Two Lois dies after telling Kal-L she was happy to have lived such a long life. Kal-El hears Kal-L's screams of sorrow from the current Earth and investigates. A griefstricken Kal-L angrily attacks Kal-El upon his arrival, blaming him for corrupting Earth-Two as he did his own Earth. During the fight, both Supermen experience lucid visions of the other's life and try to change things on the other's Earth for the better. However, they both fail.

After the fight, Kal-L realizes that a perfect Earth does not need a Superman and that Alexander is using him for his own purposes. Kal-L survives the collapse of the alternate Earths into New Earth and witnesses the death of Kon-El, making him realize he condemned the wrong Superboy.

Kal-L and Kal-El then join forces to defeat Doomsday and Bizarro during the Secret Society's assault on Metropolis. The two Supermen then team up to overcome Superboy-Prime by dragging him into space through Krypton's red sun Rao, causing all three to lose their powers and crash land on Mogo, a planet of the Green Lantern Corps. Kal-L and Kal-El, without powers, fight Superboy-Prime on Mogo's surface, where Superboy-Prime savagely beats Kal-L to death.

Kal-El then intervenes and overpowers Superboy-Prime, and defeats him before succumbing to the Kryptonite. Superboy-Prime is then imprisoned by several Green Lanterns. Having witnessed his other self's nobility and courage, Kal-L dies in Power Girl's arms, affirming that Clark is the true Superman, and telling Kara that he will always be with her. His last word is a whispered "Lois".

Blackest Night

Kal-L and his wife Lois Lane Kent of pre-Crisis Earth-Two return to the DC Universe as soulless Black Lanterns in Blackest Night. After killing an unknown number of residents of Smallville, they attack the Kent family by kidnapping Martha to lure his modern counterpart and Superboy Conner Kent into a confrontation. Kal-L and Lois have stated their intention to reunite the family with Jonathan Kent in death. Kal-L proves to be almost unstoppable until Conner steals the Black Lantern Psycho-Pirate's Medusa Mask, using its emotion-creating powers to draw Kal-L's ring away from his body, returning Kal-L's corpse to its lifeless state once more.

Kal-L's corpse is placed in Justice Society headquarters away from the Black Lanterns. Black Lantern Lois tries to get close enough to her husband's body, but Power Girl prevents her. Black Lantern Lois sacrifices herself by removing her ring and giving it to Kal-L to reanimate him. During the battle between Kal-L and Power Girl, Mister Terrific creates a machine – powered by Alan Scott's ring, the Helm of Nabu, Lightning's electrical abilities and Stargirl's cosmic rod – that destroys Black Lanterns. Mr. Terrific activates the machine, severing the Black Ring's connection to Superman.

Convergence

In the backstory to the 2015 DC Comics event Convergence, Brainiac collects the city of Metropolis from pre-Crisis Earth-Two right before the entire timeline is erased at the conclusion of the Crisis on Infinite Earths. The city is covered in a dome, which suppresses the powers of those within it and its sent to Telos alongside many other cities from other doomed timelines. Kal-L and Lois are in Metropolis when it happens. During the next year, Kal-L eventually reveals his secret identity as Superman to the public and works as a journalist to help keep the city's peace. When the dome is opened and Kal-L and the other heroes recover their powers, Telos, an entity which claims to be the planet itself, announces that they need to fight against other domed cities for their survival, otherwise their own cities and people would be destroyed. Refusing to participate in Telos' game, Kal-L stops the battle between Power Girl and Earth-30's Wonder Woman and leaves alongside Power Girl in an attempt to put an end to the entire battle.

Following the conclusion of the Convergence, all parallel universes and alternate timelines are restored and composed as the new multiverse, including the pre-Crisis Earth-Two and thus Kal-L remains in existence as the result. However, what exactly happened to Kal-L and other inhabitants of the old Earth-Two in the new timeline is not directly shown.

Powers and abilities
The Earth-Two Superman has super-strength, the power of flight, super-speed, super-breath, arctic breath, super-hearing, super-vision (including X-ray, heat, microscopic and telescopic visions), and invulnerability to most forces other than magic, psionics, and Kryptonite. He is at least as strong as Superman of the Silver Age from the Pre-Crisis continuity, and was capable of landing the killing blow against Anti-Monitor (who had been weakened prior), reducing him to a skull with a punch "that could shatter stars."

An additional ability that actual Golden Age Superman possessed, which his modern counterpart does not, is an ability to "mold" his face and body to disguise himself, as chronicled in several Golden Age tales.

Originally, Kal-L was significantly weaker than the Silver Age Superman of Earth-One or the Modern Age Superman; it was later revealed his powers took longer to develop or be discovered. While Kal-L could only super-leap an eighth of a mile until adulthood, as costumed Superman, Kal-L later gained full-fledged flight by the early 1940s. By the time Kal-L met Kal-El in the late 1960s, the two heroes were almost evenly matched in powers. However, almost all later renditions of the Earth-Two Kal-L showed him exhibiting his more limited abilities, including a temporary reliance on his leaping ability while allied with the Justice Society on a case involving his cousin Power Girl and the immortal criminal Vandal Savage. Kal-L reasoned that his diminished power stemmed from aging: "I was at my most powerful when I was in my thirties, but as I've gotten older, I've naturally grown a bit weaker."

Based on Superman's first origin and subsequent reference by U-Ban, this Superman came from a race of Kryptonians that possessed superhuman strength, leaping ability and some visual aptitudes to compensate for that planet's greater gravitation pull. Most accounts of the Kal-L's origin state that his powers came from his Kryptonian heritage, not from the energy of a yellow sun (Secret Origins #1 [1986]). A later conflicting reinterpretation stated that his powers fluctuated when under a red sun, as noted in Infinite Crisis and All-Star Comics.

Black Lantern

As a Black Lantern, Kal-L's black power ring needs to be charged by feeding on the hearts of living beings within the emotional spectrum. The ring appears to have given Kal-L's body all the abilities he would have had as a Kryptonian under a yellow sun, as well as the ability to recall certain aspects of his former life. Wearing the ring, however, places Kal-L under the influences of Nekron and his disciples Scar and Black Hand.

Other versions

Post Crisis Earth-2 "missing" Superman and wife
In the final issue of the weekly comic book 52, a new Multiverse is revealed, originally consisting of 52 identical realities. Among them is one designated "Earth-2". As a result of Mister Mind "eating" aspects of this reality, it takes on visual aspects similar to the pre-Crisis Earth-Two, including an alternate Superman and other Justice Society characters, although the names of the characters and the team are not mentioned in the panel in which they appear.

According to comments by Grant Morrison, this alternate universe is not the pre-Crisis Earth-Two. This separation was confirmed in Justice Society of America Annual #1 (2008) when, during the battle between New Earth's Justice Society of America and Earth-2's Justice Society Infinity, it is revealed that this universe's Superman has been missing for several years after a major crisis. The Post-Crisis Earth-2 Power Girl (a distinct character from the pre-Crisis Earth-Two Power Girl who resided on New Earth since Crisis) searched in vain for him for years. Starman admits the possibility that the missing Post-Crisis Earth-2 Superman is still alive (Justice Society of America [second series] #23) despite being lost, whereas Kal-L is dead.

The New 52 Earth 2
A completely separate Earth-2 Superman was introduced in the new Earth 2 series launched in May 2012 as part of "The New 52" (a reboot of the DC Comics universe). This version of Superman is named Kal-El, the same as the main version, not Kal-L as the original. The Earth-2 Kal-El is also far younger than the original Kal-L, being only a little older than the mainstream Superman. The new Earth-2 Superman's aged foster parents John and Martha Kent both survive to the present unlike that of the current mainstream Superman.

This new Earth-2 Superman was seemingly killed alongside his world's Batman and Wonder Woman while fighting off an invasion from the planet Apokolips led by Steppenwolf. However, issue #16 reveals that he not only survived, but had somehow allied himself with Apokopolis while taking the name Brutaal. After being snapped out of Darkseid's control by his wife Lois Lane (who in this reality inhabits the wind-manipulating robot body known as Red Tornado after it was uploaded into the android body by Sam Lane and Robert Crane), Superman and Red Tornado leave for the Kent family's farm. After a protracted battle with Earth 2's superheroes, in particular Green Lantern (Alan Scott) and a younger Kryptonian, Val-Zod, he is revealed to be scaling and decomposing. Realizing he is a Bizarro-type clone and that his power is waning, he is destroyed by Lois using a cyclone blast from her hand.

Writer James Robinson commented on this version of Superman: "Mourning the death of his beloved, Superman carries both a sadness in his heart along with the weight of Earth 2′s welfare upon on his shoulders, while never showing this and seeming to all that he is this world's peerless champion."

Val-Zod
Created by Tom Taylor and Nicola Scott, The Earth-2 universe's Val-Zod takes over the role of Superman from Kal-El starting in Earth-2 #25 and throughout the Earth-2: World's End mini-series. The character's name Val-Zod hints he may be part of the House of Zod, or the Earth-2 counterpart of Lor-Zod.

Val-Zod was rendered an orphan when his parents were executed by the Kryptonian court and he later befriended fellow orphan Kara Zor-El. He was later among the orphans that were saved from Krypton's destruction by Jor-El and Lara. During the travels to Earth, Val-Zod learned about his parents' knowledge about violence being the stupidest way to overcome something leading to Val-Zod becoming a pacifist. When Val-Zod landed on Earth, he was taken in by Terry Sloan who offered to protect him from the outside world. He helped Sloan make the firepits.

Val-Zod was later found by the Wonders to fight what appeared to be a brainwashed Superman calling himself Brutaal and discovered that he was a Kryptonian. Val-Zod revealed to them that he spent his childhood in a capsule and developed a fear of big open spaces. Red Tornado (who has the mind of the late Lois Lane) was able to give him a convincing pep talk.

After Red Tornado taught Val-Zod how to use his abilities, they were attacked by the Parademons. Alan Scott saved them as Val-Zod told Batman II about saving Red Tornado. Due to an attack by the Apokoliptian forces, Val-Zod and Batman had to evacuate from the Batcave. Making their way to Amazonia, Val-Zod is blamed by Batman for not using his powers and letting Red Arrow die. Jimmy Olsen states to Batman that it wasn't Val-Zod's fault. When he asks Val-Zod what is underneath his hoodie, Val-Zod shows the symbol of the House of El.

After a talk with Jimmy Olsen and Doctor Fate, Val-Zod rose up and fought Superman who cracked and crumbled revealing that this Superman is a deformed and perverted clone. After the Superman clone was reduced to dust, the Wonders declared their victory against Apokolips.

Accompanying Red Tornado and Batman to save the people from the remaining fire pits, Val-Zod encountered Huntress and Power Girl. A massive earthquake enabled a creature called K'li: Fury of War to emerge from the fire pit. They fought against K'li until she took control of Huntress and Power Girl so that she can kill them and join her Fury sisters. Red Tornado was able to get through to Huntress and Power Girl to break the mind-control. The group then takes a detour to a nearby lab that sent the distress signal as it was being attacked by mutated creatures. Val-Zod and Power Girl combined their abilities to destroy the creatures and rescue everyone. Using special suits to enter the fire pits, they encounter DeSaad and find his special laboratory where he was creating imperfect clones of Superman. When Batman was suffering from the madness that the Miraclo is bringing him, Val-Zod destroyed the Miraclo. The dead clones have awoken as the group is confronted by the Parademons as Helena arrives having been converted into the Fury of Famine.

As Power Girl took on Huntress, Val-Zod worked to evacuate the others only for DeSaad to unleash Yolanda Montez (who was transformed into the Avatar of the Red) on them. Val-Zod used his blood to poison the labyrinth while also freeing Yolanda. Afterwards, Val-Zod and Power Girl bury the real Superman's body on a hill and then headed to the World Army outpost where they answer Flash's distress call. Val-Zod uses his charged cells to overload K'li. Though Deathspawn has emerged and Atom's Haven is attacked by Protofuries led by Barda. Val-Zod and Kara met up with Commander Sonia Sato at the headquarters at Atom's Haven. When Darkseid's terraformer fell to Earth, Val-Zod saw it as a threat.

Val-Zod begins his attack on the terraformer with the assistance of Power Girl and Red Tornado which caused it to unleash a horde of Parademons. Commander Sato took control of the Parademons and sent them to attack Apokolips.

In other media

Television
In the Justice League episode "Legends", the League teams up with the Justice Guild of America, a superhero team which is an analogue of the Justice Society of America. Justice Guild member Tom Turbine is depicted as an amalgamation of Kal-L and the Golden Age Atom, Al Pratt.
 A limited series centered on the Val-Zod version of Superman is in development for HBO Max from Michael B. Jordan and his company Outlier Society. Writers were hired for the project by the end of July 2021, with Jordan potentially starring in the series and executive producing alongside Elizabeth Raposo. Darnell Metayer and Josh Peters were revealed in October to be the writers.

Film
Kal-L appears in Justice Society: World War II, voiced by Darren Criss. He first appears under the alias of "Shakespeare", a war correspondent to the Justice Society of America. When Clark reveals his real name to Wonder Woman, Steve Trevor, and a displaced Barry Allen, he reveals his background of growing up in an orphanage since the deaths of Jonathan and Martha Kent when he was three causing Barry to come to the conclusion that he is on another Earth since his Superman's origin was different. Clark later wears his Superman outfit, prepared for him by Kent Nelson, when he destroys the Nazis' bomber fleet.

Video games
 Though not the feature character, Kal-L specifically appears in the video games Justice League Heroes and Superman Returns as an alternate costume for Superman complete with white hair at the hairline.
 The Black Lantern Kal-L appears as an alternate skin in Injustice: Gods Among Us.

References

External links
Superman Through the Ages: Earth-2 Superman
The Golden Age Superman Site
JSA Fact File: Superman
Earth-2 Superman Index

Alternative versions of Superman
Characters created by Dennis O'Neil
Characters created by Dick Dillin
Characters created by Jerry Siegel
Characters created by Joe Shuster
Comics characters introduced in 1969
DC Comics characters who are shapeshifters
DC Comics characters who can move at superhuman speeds
DC Comics characters with accelerated healing
DC Comics characters with superhuman senses
DC Comics characters with superhuman strength
DC Comics extraterrestrial superheroes
DC Comics male superheroes
DC Comics orphans
DC Comics telepaths
Earth-Two
Fictional characters with slowed ageing
Fictional characters with X-ray vision
Fictional characters with superhuman durability or invulnerability
Fictional characters with nuclear or radiation abilities
Fictional characters with air or wind abilities
Fictional characters with ice or cold abilities
Fictional characters with absorption or parasitic abilities
Fictional characters with energy-manipulation abilities
Fictional characters with fire or heat abilities
Fictional characters who can manipulate sound
Fictional characters who can manipulate time
Fictional World War II veterans
Golden Age superheroes
Infinite Crisis
Kryptonians
Time travelers
United States-themed superheroes
Superman characters

ja:スーパーマン (架空の人物)